HSC Skane Jet is an Incat-built, ocean-going catamaran. It is one of the world's fastest car carrying passenger vessels and, as Cat-Link V, set the eastbound record for the fastest transatlantic journey. In 1998/1999, the ship sailed as Cat-Link V on the Århus-Kalundborg route in Denmark—then operated by Scandlines. From 1999 to 2005 it sailed as Mads Mols for Mols-linien. From 2005 to 2006 it was renamed Incat 049 by T&T Ferries in Trinidad and Tobago. In 2006 it was renamed Master Cat and has since been operating on the route between Kristiansand in Norway and Hanstholm in Denmark, later changed to Hirtshals, in the service of "Master Ferries". This company was merged with Fjord Line on 1 January 2008 and the ferry was renamed Fjord Cat.

The ship has been renamed "Skane Jet" as part of its relocation for the Königslinie route between Sassnitz and Ystad for FRS. This route started service in late September 2020.

Sister ships
 – P&O Irish Sea

References

External links
 DNV.com, Vessel registry info
 Incat.com, photo gallery and information from builder
 Record at ferry-site.dk

|-

Ships built by Incat
Blue Riband holders
Ferries of Norway
Incat high-speed craft
1998 ships
Merchant ships of Norway